Ectobiidae (formerly Blattellidae) is a family of the order Blattodea (cockroaches). This family contains many of the smaller common household pest cockroaches, among others. They are sometimes called wood cockroaches. A few notable species include:
 Asian cockroach Blattella asahinai
 German cockroach Blattella germanica
 Small yellow cockroach Cariblatta lutea
 Brown-banded cockroach Supella longipalpa
 European native cockroaches - genera including Ectobius, Capraiellus, Phyllodromica and Planuncus
 Parcoblatta spp. including the:
 Fulvous wood cockroach P. fulvescens
 Pennsylvania wood cockroach Parcoblatta pennsylvanica
 Virginia wood cockroach Parcoblatta virginica

Subfamilies and selected Genera
The Cockroach Species File includes five subfamilies.  The Anaplectinae, previously placed here, have now been elevated to family level.
NB: subfamilies marked § are complete list as of 2020:

Blattellinae
Auth.: Karny, 1908 – worldwide
 Attaphila Wheeler, 1900 (Neotropical)
 Blattella Caudell, 1903
 Ischnoptera Burmeister, 1838
 Lobopterella Princis, 1957
 Parcoblatta Shellford, 1911
 Pseudomops Serville, 1831
 Saltoblattella Bohn, Picker, Klass & Colville, 2009
 Symploce Hebard, 1916
 Temnopteryx Brunner von Wattenwyl, 1865

Ectobiinae
§ Brunner von Wattenwyl, 1865 – Europe, Africa, Asia, Australia
 Arbiblatta Chopard, 1936
 Capraiellus Harz, 1976
 Choristima Tepper, 1895
 Ectobius Stephens, 1835
 Ectoneura Shelford, 1907
 Eutheganopteryx Shelford, 1912
 Luridiblatta Fernandes, 1965
 Phyllodromica Fieber, 1853
 Planuncus Bohn, 2013
 Pseudectoneura Princis, 1974
 Stenectoneura Hebard, 1943
 Theganopteryx Brunner von Wattenwyl, 1865

Nyctiborinae
§ – south America
 Eunyctibora Shelford, 1908
 Eushelfordia Hebard, 1925
 Eushelfordiella Lopes & Oliveira, 2007
 Megaloblatta Dohrn, 1887
 Muzoa Hebard, 1921
 Nyctantonina Vélez, 2013
 Nyctibora Burmeister, 1838
 Paramuzoa Roth, 1973
 Paratropes Serville, 1838
 Pseudischnoptera Saussure, 1869

Pseudophyllodromiinae
Worldwide distribution
 Pseudophyllodromia Brunner von Wattenwyl, 1865
 Supella Shelford, 1911

Genera incertae sedis
 Africablatta Rehn, 1933: A. patricia (Gerstaecker, 1883)
 Akaniblatta Princis, 1969
 Alsteinia Hanitsch, 1950
 Anareolaria Shelford, 1909
 Aneurinita Hebard, 1935
 Anisopygia Saussure, 1893
 Antitheton Hebard, 1919
 Aphlebiella Princis, 1965
 Aruistra Princis, 1965
 Astyloblatta Bey-Bienko, 1954
 Atticola Bolívar, 1905
 Blattellina Princis, 1951
 Lanta Hebard, 1921
 many others

See also 
 American cockroach
 Pest control

References 

Cockroach families